Andrew Philip Hollingsworth (born 11 October 1979) is an English cricketer.  Hollingsworth is a right-handed batsman who bowls right-arm medium pace.  He was born at Chertsey, Surrey.

Hollingsworth represented the Surrey Cricket Board in 2 List A matches against  Lincolnshire in the 1st round of the 2002 Cheltenham & Gloucester Trophy which was played in 2001 and the Essex Cricket Board in the 2nd round of the 2003 Cheltenham & Gloucester Trophy which was held in 2002.  In his 2 matches for the Board, he scored 56 runs at a batting average of 28.00, with a high score of 29.  In the field he took 3 catches.  With the ball he took 3 wickets at an average of 27.66, with best figures of 3/36.

Hollingsworth made his first-class debut for Durham UCCE against Durham in 2002.  During 2002 he represented the University in 2 further first-class matches against Nottinghamshire and Lancashire.  In his 3 first-class matches, he scored 72 runs at an average of 24.00, with a high score of 42*.  In the field he took a single catch.  With the ball he took 4 wickets at an average of 21.50, with best figures of 3/35.

References

External links
Andrew Hollingsworth at Cricinfo
Andrew Hollingsworth at CricketArchive

1979 births
Living people
Sportspeople from Chertsey
People from Surrey
English cricketers
Surrey Cricket Board cricketers
Durham MCCU cricketers